Żerdziny may refer to:

Żerdziny, Silesian Voivodeship, Poland
Żerdziny, Warmian-Masurian Voivodeship, Poland